The 2006 Las Vegas Gladiators season was the 10th season for the franchise. They finished the season 5–11, 4th place in the Western Division.  The Gladiators did not qualify for the playoffs.

Stats

Offense

Quarterback

Running backs

Wide receivers

Touchdowns

Defense

Special teams

Kick return

Kicking

External links

Las Vegas Gladiators
Las Vegas Gladiators seasons
Las